The Camels are Coming is a 1934 British comedy adventure film directed by Tim Whelan and starring Jack Hulbert, Anna Lee, Hartley Power and Harold Huth. A British officer in the Royal Egyptian Air Force combats drug smugglers.

Plot
British officer Jack Campbell (Jack Hulbert) has arrived in Cairo with the first aircraft of the newly-formed  Egyptian Air Force. Jack commands the first group of volunteer aviators. The general commanding the Air Force gives him the mission to stop Nicholas (Hartley Power), an American posing as an archaeologist, but involved in drug trafficking.

Nicholas has the help of an Arab sheikh, whose caravans crisscross the desert. During a patrol, Jack intercepts one of these caravans without finding anything. Just then, an aircraft piloted by a beautiful aviator, Anita Rogers (Anna Lee) lands nearby. Back in Cairo, Jack is sure Anita has something to do with the criminal activities, and follows her.

Jack manages to steal a suitcase that a stranger gives to Anita. After a chase among the pyramids of Gizeh, suitcase turns out to contain only cigarettes. The escapade makes headlines and Jack feels the wrath of the general's anger. Shortly after, Anita, who has fallen in love with Jack, apologizes and offers to help Jack by playing the role of the Sheikh's wife while Jack pretends to be the sheikh.

While disguised as Arab, Jack offers Nicholas the chance to sell him hashish. The pretense is  uncovered when the real Sheikh arrives. A fight ensues with Jack managing to knock out the two drug traffickers. Jack and Anita, with Nicholas slung over a horse, are pursued by the sheikh's men.

Jack and Anita take refuge in the ruins of a fort, where they are soon besieged but manage to warn Cairo, thanks to a passenger pigeon. The general immediately sends aircraft and troops to help them.

With the drug smugglers put away, Jack and Anita plan their happy future.

Cast
 Jack Hulbert as Jack Campbell
 Anna Lee as Anita Rodgers
 Hartley Power as Nicholas
 Harold Huth as Doctor Zhiga
 Allan Jeayes as Sheikh
 Peter Gawthorne as Colonel Fairley
 Norma Whalley as Tourist
 Peggy Simpson as Tourist
 Tony De Lungo as Smuggler's servant
 Percy Parsons as Arab

Production
Based on a story by Tim Whelan and Russell Medcraft, The Camels are Coming was directed by Tim Whelan, an American who made a number of British films. It was filmed at Islington Studios and on location in Egypt around Cairo and Gizeh including at the famous Shepheard's Hotel.

The aircraft used in The Camels are Coming were: 
 Avro 626
 de Havilland DH.60G Gipsy Moth II c/n 3053, SU-ABB
 de Havilland DH.60G Gipsy II Moth c/n 1914, SU-ABF

Many of the scenes in The Camels are Coming later had to be reshot in London at the Gainsborough Pictures studios, as sand had got into the cameras, and high winds prevented the recording of dialogue.

The Camels are Coming was a major success at the British box office, but was not released in the United States.

Surviving Recording
On the 1968 Music for Pleasure (record label) LP record release, (A Fabulous Cast Sing and Play) 'The Hits of Noel Gay', (MFP1236), Track 3, Side 2, includes 'Who's Been Polishing the Sun' ?, with Hulbert Assisted by 'Eddie and Rex and Orchestra'. Before the film's re-release on commercial dvd, in 'British Comedies of the 1930s, Volume 8', forty-eight years later in 2016, this release was the only way the recording could be heard. (Brian Rust wrote its liner notes).

Reception
In the review of The Camels are Coming, the TV Guide wrote: "Lightweight comedy is slightly above average for British offerings of the period."

References

Notes

Citations

Bibliography

 Bawden, James and Ronald G. Miller. Conversations with Classic Film Stars: Interviews from Hollywood's Golden Era. Lexington, Kentucky: University Press of Kentucky, 2016. .
 Reid, John Howard. Hollywood's Classic Comedies Featuring Slapstick, Romance, Music, Glamour Or Screwball Fun!. Morrisville, North Carolina: Lulu.com, 2007. .
 Richards, Jeffrey. The Unknown 1930s: An Alternative History of the British Cinema, 1929– 1939. London: I.B. Tauris & Co, 1998. .

External links
 
 
 

1934 films
British aviation films
British adventure comedy films
1930s adventure comedy films
Films set in Egypt
British black-and-white films
Films scored by Jack Beaver
1934 comedy films
1930s English-language films
Films directed by Tim Whelan
1930s British films